Bloodsport 4: The Dark Kumite is a 1999 action film directed by Elvis Restaino. It is the fourth and final film in the Bloodsport franchise. It was released direct-to-video in 1999 and stars Daniel Bernhardt as police officer John Keller.

Premise
Agent John Keller (Daniel Bernhardt) goes undercover into the tough prison known as Fuego Penal to find out about the corpses of prisoners disappearing without a trace. There he gets involved in a dangerous tournament, The Kumite, arranged by a man named Justin Caesar (Ivan Ivanov), where the prisoners are forced to fight to the death. The tournament has only one rule: There are no rules.

Cast
Daniel Bernhardt – Agent John Keller
 Stefanos Miltsakakis – Max Schrek
 Ivan Ivanov – Justin Caesar
 Lisa Stothard – Blaire
 Michael Krawic – Winston
Derek McGrath – Warden Preston
 David Rowe – Billings
 Elvis Restaino – Dr. Rosenbloom
 Dennis LaValle – Files
 Christine Marais – Regina
 Jeff Moldovan – Captain Anderson
 Mike Kirton – Prison Guard
 Mitko Kiskimov – Tongo
 Linda Kouleva – Rita
Stefan Valdobrev – Gills

Production
The prison sequences were shot at a real prison in Bulgaria and actual prisoners were extras in the scenes. Although the film was shot in Bulgaria, Bloodsport 4 is set in the United States. This not only makes it the only Bloodsport movie set there, but the only Bloodsport movie to not be set where it was shot. Though Daniel Bernhardt stars in all Bloodsport films except the first, his character is not Alex Cardo from Bloodsport III but it is now John Keller in this film.

Reception
The film was panned by critics. Robert Pardi of TV Guide gave the film one star and said: "The good news is that you needn't bother watching the first three BLOODSPORT flicks in order to make sense of this sequel. The bad news is that it's pure Grade-Z schlock."

International titles
Argentina: Bloodsport: Matar O Morir (Bloodsport: Kill Or Die)
Brazil: O Grande Dragāo Branco 4: O Capítulo Final (The Great White Dragon 4: The Last Chapter)
Russia: Кровавый Спорт IV: Цвет Тьмы
Portugal: Bloodsport IV: Condenado À Morte (Bloodsport IV: Condemned To Death)
Spain: Contacto Sangriento 4: El Kumite Oscuro (Bloody Contact 4: The Dark Kumite)
UK: The Final Chapter: Bloodsport 4

References

External links
 
film review

1999 films
1999 direct-to-video films
1999 action films
1999 martial arts films
American action films
American martial arts films
Bloodsport (film series)
1990s English-language films
Films scored by Alex Wurman
Films shot in Bulgaria
Karate films
Martial arts tournament films
Underground fighting films
American sequel films
Direct-to-video sequel films
1990s American films